YPAR (Youth-led Participatory Action Research) is a social justice term used to describe the community-based research that youth partake in.

The Center for Studies of Boys and Girls’ Lives at the University of Pennsylvania hosts an annual roundtable gathering of organizations sponsoring YPARs. Member schools include Columbus Academy (Gahanna, OH), Georgetown Day School (Washington, DC), Greens Farms Academy (Greens Farms, CT), Greenwich Academy (Greenwich, CT), Lawrenceville School (Lawrenceville, NJ), Miss Porter's School (Farmington, CT), Phillips Exeter Academy (Exeter, NH), The Maret School (Washington, DC), and The Shipley School (Bryn Mawr, PA).

References

Youth organizations based in Pennsylvania